The Association of Theatrical Press Agents & Managers (ATPAM) is an American union organization for press agents and managers in the theatrical profession.

ATPAM received a charter from the American Federation of Labor (AFL) in 1928. They have been part of the International Alliance of Theatrical Stage Employees since 1937.

Selected members

 Mark Bramble
 Adrian Bryan-Brown
 Alan Eichler
 Grant A. Rice

References

External links
 ATPAM website

Organizations established in 1928
1928 establishments in the United States
Professional associations based in the United States
Theatrical organizations in the United States
American Federation of Labor